The Kuyani people, also written Guyani and other variants, and also known as the Nganitjidi, are an Aboriginal Australian people of the state of South Australia who speak the Kuyani language. Their traditional lands are to the west of the Flinders Ranges.

Country
Their northeastern boundary was at Murnpeowie. Their western frontier lay at Turret Range and Andamooka. They also occupied the area to the north of, but not including, Lake Torrens. However, Lake Torrens was of great significance to the Kuyani people, known to them as Ngarndamukia,  meaning "shower of rain". Kuyani woman Regina McKenzie said that the Kuyani were "the law holders of what anthropologists would call the lake's culture people".

The Kuyani around Beltana and Leigh Creek were known as the Adjnjakujani from a word, adjna meaning "hill," while those near Lake Torrens were called plainspeople (Wartakujani.)

Their neighbours to the east are the Adnyamathanha people, whose language is closely related.

Alternative names
 Kujani, Kuyanni
 Kwiani, Kwiana
 Kooyiannie
 Gujani
 Owinia
 Cooyiannie
 Kooyeeunna, Kooteeunna
 Nganitjidi (Barngarla exonym, meaning "those who sneak and kill by night")
 Ngannityiddi

Language

The Kuyani language is extinct today, with no speakers recorded since 1975.

Some words
 wilker (dog, both tame and wild)
 papi (father)
 comie/knumie (mother)
 coodnoo (white man)

Notes

Citations

Sources

Aboriginal peoples of South Australia